Menkheperre, son of Pharaoh Pinedjem I by wife Duathathor-Henuttawy (daughter of Ramesses XI by wife Tentamon), was the High Priest of Amun at Thebes in ancient Egypt from 1045 BC to 992 BC and de facto ruler of the south of the country.

Biography
Menkheperre's eldest full brother Masaharta followed their father Pinedjem I as High Priest. He was followed by another brother, Djedkhonsuefankh, after whose death, in the 25th year of Smendes I, Menkheperre became High Priest. With his elder half-brother ruling at Tanis as Pharaoh Psusennes I, Menkheperre's power, like that of Masaharta, must have been somewhat curtailed. Menkheperre took as his throne name the title of "First prophet of Amun", just as his great-grandfather Herihor had, perhaps an indication of this diminished role, though he kept the cartouche unlike his successors in the temple.

Menkheperre married his niece Isetemkheb, daughter of his brother Psusennes I and wife Wiay. Their children were:

 Smendes II, also called Nesbanebdjed II, who followed him as High Priest.
 Henuttawy C, wife of Smendes II, Chantress of Amun. She is mentioned on the 10th pylon of the  Karnak temple. She was buried in the Deir el-Bahari tomb MMA60, her coffins are now in Boston and New York. She had a daughter called Isetemkheb.
 Pinedjem II, High Priest after his brother's death. He married his sister Isetemkheb and became the father of Pharaoh Psusennes II.
 Isetemkheb D, wife of Pinedjem II.
 Hori, priest of Amun and Seth. His mummy and coffins were found at Bab el-Gasus (Deir el-Bahari) and are now in Cairo.
 Meritamen, Chantress of Amun. She was buried at Bab el-Gasus under the pontificate of Psusennes II. Her coffins are in Cairo.
 Gautseshen, Chantress of Montu. She was buried at Bab el-Gasus, her coffins and papyrus are now in Cairo. She was married to Tjanefer, Third Prophet of Amun. Their sons, Pinedjem and Menkheperre became Third and Fourth Prophet of Amun, respectively.
 Psusennes, priest of Min, Horus and Isis at Coptos, known from a stela at the British Museum.

See also
Banishment Stela, a stela issued by Menkheperre during his early pontificate and containing an amnesty decree for some rebels.

References

Further reading
 Philippe Collombert, Quand Menkheperre s'adresse à Amon (Stèle du Bannissement, L.12), in: RdÉ 48 (1997), 257-259.
 Gabrielle Dembitz, The Oracular Inscription of the High Priest of Amun Menkheperre in the Khonsu Temple at Karnak, in: A. Hudecz – M. Petrik (eds): Commerce and Economy in Ancient Egypt. Proceedings of The Third International Congress for Young Egyptologists; 25 - 27 September 2009, 2010
 Cathie Spieser, La titulature du grand-prêtre d'Amon Menkheperré de la statuette N43 du Musée de Durham, in: CdÉ 77 (2002), 47-54
 Cahail, K.M & Damarani, A. (2016), "The Sarcophagus of the High Priest of Amun, Menkheperre, from the Coptic monastery of Apa Moses at Abydos". Mitteilungen des Deutschen Archäologischen Instituts Abteilung Kairo (MDAIK) 72, pp. 11-30.

11th-century BC clergy
10th-century BC clergy
Theban High Priests of Amun
People of the Twenty-first Dynasty of Egypt